Matilda McDonell (born 22 June 2000) is an Australian netball player in the Suncorp Super Netball league, playing for Giants Netball. 

Tilly McDonell was contracted by the Giants ahead of the 2019 season. She has represented New South Wales and Australia at underage level and prior to being signed by the Giants was an influential player in the second-tier Australian Netball League and Netball NSW Premier League competitions.  McDonell also studies a Bachelor of Laws / Psychological Science at the University of New South Wales & is a current Ben Lexcen scholarship holder.

References

External links
 Giants Netball Profile
 Suncorp Super Netball Profile
 Interview with Matilda McDonell – YouTube
 Sydney Morning Herald Interview 

2000 births
Australian netball players
Giants Netball players
Living people
Suncorp Super Netball players
Australian Netball League players
Netball players from New South Wales
University of New South Wales alumni
New South Wales Institute of Sport netball players
New South Wales state netball league players